Tuncer Duhan Aksu (born 11 September 1997) is a Turkish professional footballer who plays as a left-back for Süper Lig club İstanbulspor.

Career
Aksu is a product of the youth academy of Fenerbahçe, and moved to İstanbulspor youth sides in 2017. In 2018 he was promoted to their senior team and debuted in the TFF First League. He controversially signed a pre-agreement with Lille OSC in 2018, that was cancelled as a hidden payment from Lille to İstanbulspor for the transfer Zeki Çelik. In January 2021, he had arthroscopic hip surgery that kept him off the field for 3 months. He helped İstanbulspor achieve promotion in the 2021-22 season for the first time in 17 years. He made his professional debut with İstanbulspor in a 2–0 Süper Lig loss to Trabzonspor on 5 August 2022.

International career
Aksu is a youth international for Turkey, having played for the Turkey U16s and U20s.

References

External links
 

1997 births
Living people
Sportspeople from Ankara
Turkish footballers
Turkey international footballers
İstanbulspor footballers
Süper Lig players
TFF First League players
Association football fullbacks